Madison Walthall  (October 19, 1792 – June 15, 1848) was a Virginia-born soldier who served in the US Army during the Mexican–American War and later held office in the California State Legislature.

Madison was born in Prince Edward County, Virginia to parents John Wathall and Catherine Madison. He had one child with his first wife, Mary Anne Wilson, and two children with his second wife, Elizabeth Frances Burfoot. He died in Santa Clara, California.

References

American military personnel of the Mexican–American War
Members of the California State Legislature
1792 births
1848 deaths
19th-century American politicians